Chalcoecia is a genus of moths of the family Noctuidae. The genus was erected by George Hampson in 1908.

Species
 Chalcoecia emessa H. Druce, 1889
 Chalcoecia gloria Schaus, 1911
 Chalcoecia harminella Dyar, 1920
 Chalcoecia heochroa Dyar, 1914
 Chalcoecia patina Dognin, 1922
 Chalcoecia patricia Schaus, 1911
 Chalcoecia rhodoxantha Dognin, 1908

References

Acronictinae